Estola obscuroides is a species of beetle in the family Cerambycidae. It was described by Stephan von Breuning in 1942. It is known from Paraguay.

References

Estola
Beetles described in 1942